is a private women's college in Higashiosaka, Osaka, Japan. The predecessor of the school was founded in 1917, and it was chartered as a university in 1949.

External links
 Official website 

Educational institutions established in 1917
Private universities and colleges in Japan
Universities and colleges in Osaka Prefecture
1917 establishments in Japan
Higashiōsaka